The 2019 Epping Forest District Council election took place on 2 May 2019 to elect members of Epping Forest District Council in England. This was on the same day as other local elections.

Ward Results 

Figures are compared to the last time these seats were contested in any election cycle for the Epping Forest District Council election, this is indicated.

Broadley Common, Epping Upland and Nazeing

Buckhurst Hill West

Chipping Ongar, Greensted and Marden Ash

Epping Hemnall

Epping Lindsey and Thornwood Common

Grange Hill

Hastingwood, Matching and Sheering

Lambourne

Lower Nazeing

Lower Sheering

North Weald Bassett

Roydon

Shelley

Waltham Abbey High Beach

Waltham Abbey North East

Waltham Abbey Paternoster

Waltham Abbey Honey Lane

Waltham Abbey South West

References

2019 English local elections
May 2019 events in the United Kingdom
2019
2010s in Essex